Doc Cook (1891–1958) was an American jazz bandleader.

Doc Cook may also refer to:
Doc Cook (baseball) (1886–1973), baseball player

See also
Doc Cooke, head men's basketball coach